Umayalpuram Kasiviswanatha Sivaraman (born 17 December 1935) is an Indian musician and exponent of the Carnatic percussion instrument, the mridangam. He is a recipient of the Padma Vibhushan as well as the Sangeet Natak Akademi Award.

Early life
Umayalpuram Sivaraman was born to P. Kasiviswanatha Iyer, a doctor, and his wife, Kamalambal. He learned the art of the Carnatic mridangam from four gurus over fifteen years: Arupathi Natesa Iyer, Tanjore Vaidyanatha Iyer, Palghat Mani Iyer and Kumbakonam Rangu Iyengar. He also graduated from the University of Madras with a B.A. & B.L.

Recognitions
He was conferred the award ‘Padmashri’ by the Government of India in 1988. He received Sangeet Natak Akademi award for mrudangam for the year 1992. He was conferred Kalaimamani, awarded by the Iyal Isai Nataka Mandram of Tamilnadu. He had been appointed ‘State Artiste’ of the Government of Tamil Nadu from 1981 for a period of six years. Sri Sankaracharya Swamigal has appointed Sri Sivaraman as ‘Asthana Vidwan’ of Shri Kanchi Sankara Mutt. Shri Sankaracharya Swamigal of Shri Sharada Peetam Sringeri has bestowed on Sivaraman the title of Mrudanga Kalanidhi and has appointed him as ‘Asthana Vidwan’ of Shri Sarada Peetam, Sringeri. His titles include Laya Jyothi, Laya Gnana Bhaskara, Sangeetha Kala Sikhamani, Mrudanga Nadamani (bestowed by Shri Sankaracharya of Kanchi Mutt), Mrudanga Chakravarthi, Nada Sudharnava, Tal Vilas, and Laya Gnana Tilaka, etc.

He was awarded Padma Bhushan in the year 2003 by Govt. of India. He was awarded the Padma Vibhushan, India's second highest civilian honor, on the occasion of the country's 61st Republic Day observance on 26 January 2010 and received an honorary doctorate from the University of Kerala in 2010.

Personal life
Umayalpuram Sivaraman is married to Abhirami Sivaraman. They live in Mylapore in Chennai. They have two sons - S.Swaminathan and S.Sivakumar.

Disciples
Erode Nagaraj
 Neyveli Narayanan
 Arjun Kumar
 N C Bhardwaj
 R. Ramkumar
 Madurai Sundar Balasubramaniam
 Akshay Ram
 Vignesh Venkatraman
 Nirmal Narayan
 Amangudi Ramnaryanan
 Trivandrum Hariharan
 Vishvak Kumaran
 Rajna Swaminathan

Awards 

Sangeetha Kalasikhamani from The Indian Fine Arts Society in 1984
Padma Shri from Government of India in 1988
Kalaimamani from Government of Tamil Nadu in 1977
Sangeet Natak Akademi Award in 1992
Sangeetha Kalanidhi from Madras Music Academy in 2001
Padma Bhushan from Government of India in 2003
Padma Vibhushan from Government of India in 2010
Sangeet Natak Akademi Fellowship, 2011
D.Litt from The Tamil Nadu Dr.J Jayalalithaa Music and Fine Arts University in 2019

Books
 Musical Excellence of Mrudangam authored by Umayalpuram Sivaraman, T. Ramaswami and M.D. Naresh 
 Music Makers: Living Legends of Indian Classical Music

References

External links 

 Umayalpuram Sivaraman Official Website
 Umayalpuram Sivaraman's Mridangam School
 Interview with Sri Sivaraman after the Sangeetha Kalanidhi award
 Carnatic corner - short biography
 Remembrances of things past
 I have not even touched the tip of the iceberg

1935 births
Living people
Mridangam players
Recipients of the Padma Bhushan in arts
Recipients of the Padma Shri in arts
Recipients of the Padma Vibhushan in arts
Tamil musicians
Recipients of the Sangeet Natak Akademi Fellowship
Sangeetha Kalanidhi recipients
People from Thanjavur district
Recipients of the Sangeet Natak Akademi Award